AT&T Pogo was a Mozilla Firefox based web browser developed by AT&T and Vizible. A private beta was released to a limited number of users,  but the project was terminated when Vizible sold its intellectual property to Open Text.

Features
Features that were present in the private beta release included:
 Ability to create multiple home pages.
 Visual tab pages displaying a thumbnail for each open page.
 Visual method for managing Internet bookmarks.
 Visual method for viewing and managing internet history.
 Search feature for finding bookmarks and history items.

References

AT&T
Beta software
Discontinued web browsers
Gopher clients
Web browsers based on Firefox
Windows web browsers